Will Routley (born May 23, 1983 in Whistler, British Columbia) is a Canadian former cyclist.

Major results

2004
 3rd Road race, National Under-23 Road Championships
2006
 1st Stage 3 (TTT) Vuelta a El Salvador
2007
 1st Stage 4 (TTT) Vuelta a El Salvador
2008
 9th Overall Herald Sun Tour
2009
 9th Overall Jelajah Malaysia
2010
 1st  Road race, National Road Championships
 3rd Overall Redlands Bicycle Classic
1st Stage 1
 8th Overall Tour de Korea
2011
 2nd Road race, National Road Championships
 2nd Tro-Bro Léon
2012
 9th Overall Tour of Turkey
2014
 Tour of California
1st  Mountains classification
1st Stage 4
 7th Overall Tour of the Gila
 9th White Spot / Delta Road Race
 10th Philadelphia Cycling Classic
2016
 2nd Overall GP Liberty Seguros
1st Stage 2
 3rd Road race, National Road Championships

References

1983 births
Living people
Canadian male cyclists
Cyclists at the 2014 Commonwealth Games
Commonwealth Games competitors for Canada